Woodley is an Australian television comedy series that premiered on 22 February 2012 at 8:00 pm on the ABC TV. The eight-part comedy series is written by and stars comedian Frank Woodley.

Overview
Woodley (Frank Woodley) is the chaotic and accident prone, yet devoted father of seven-year-old Ollie (Alexandra Cashmere). Recently divorced, his ex-wife Em (Justine Clarke) could not live with the chaos but Woodley secretly hopes that one day he  will win her back and they will be a family again. But with Em's new boyfriend Greg (Tom Long) on the scene, it is not going to be easy. For Em, Greg is reliable and focused, everything that Woodley was not while they were married, and it does not take long for Greg to slip easily into the fabric of their lives. Woodley struggles to come to terms with Em's new relationship and endeavours to prove to Em that he is still worthy of her love. Ollie loves her dad and Woodley is determined to never let her down or lose the special spot in her heart that she holds just for him. But as Greg's affection for Em grows, and Em in turn sees a possible future with him, will Woodley be able to win Em back before it is too late?

Cast
 Frank Woodley as Woodley
 Justine Clarke as Em
 Layla Lola  as Sally 
 Tom Long as Woody
 Alexandra Cashmere as Ollie

Series overview

Episodes

Series 1 (2012)

See also
 The Adventures of Lano and Woodley

References

External links
 
 

Australian Broadcasting Corporation original programming
Australian comedy television series
2012 Australian television series debuts
2012 Australian television series endings
English-language television shows